Geert Steurs (born 24 September 1981 in Schoten) is a Belgian professional road bicycle racer, who last rode for .

Major results 

2004
 3rd Road race, National Amateur Road Championships
2006
 1st  Overall Tour of Hong Kong Shanghai
1st Stage 1
 2nd Flèche Ardennaise
 2nd Circuit de Wallonie
 5th Kattekoers
 5th Internationale Wielertrofee Jong Maar Moedig
 8th Nokere Koerse
2007
 3rd Nokere Koerse
2008
 6th Halle–Ingooigem
 7th Grote Prijs Jef Scherens
 9th Grand Prix d'Ouverture La Marseillaise
2009
 7th Halle–Ingooigem
 9th Overall Sachsen-Tour
2010
 2nd Overall Tour of Qatar
1st Stage 2

External links 
Personal website
 

1981 births
Living people
Belgian male cyclists
People from Schoten
Cyclists from Antwerp Province